Boris Aronson (October 15, 1898 – November 16, 1980) was an American scenic designer for Broadway and Yiddish theatre. He won the Tony Award for Scenic Design six times in his career.

Biography
The son of a Rabbi, Aronson was born in Kiev, in the Russian Empire (in present-day Ukraine), and enrolled in art school during his youth. Aronson became an apprentice to the designer Aleksandra Ekster, who introduced him to the directors Vsevolod Meyerhold and Alexander Tairov, who influenced him. These three theatre and art veterans were advocates of the Constructivist school in Russia, as opposed to Stanislavski's form of Realism, and they convinced Aronson to embrace the Constructivist style.

Aronson worked for some years in Moscow and Germany. In Berlin he exhibited at the seminal Van Diemen Gallery "First Exhibition of Russian Art", alongside the Constructivists El Lissitzky and Naum Gabo, which introduced Constructivism to the West. He wrote two books in Berlin, on Marc Chagall and Jewish graphic art, before he obtained an Immigrant Visa for America in 1923. He moved to the Lower East Side in New York City and began designing sets and costumes for the more experimental of the city's Yiddish theatres, including the Unser Theater, the Schildkraut Theatre, and most notably Maurice Schwartz's Yiddish Art Theatre. He achieved fame in New York's Jewish community when he designed Schwartz's 1926 revival of Abraham Goldfaden's play The Tenth Commandment. Although he shunned politics, Aronson produced sets for the Communist affiliated ARTEF (Arbeiter Teater Farband, Workers' Theatre Union), such as Lag Boymer and Jim Kooperkop in 1930. However, he soon after left the Yiddish Theatre to prevent his work's "ghettoization", and debuted on Broadway, in 1932, with a revival of Vernon Duke and Yip Harburg's Walk a Little Faster. During the 1930s, he worked on productions by the Group Theatre, including works by Clifford Odets and Irwin Shaw.

From 1934 to 1952, Aronson designed scenes, costumes, and lighting for thirty-four plays and three musicals on Broadway (including his design for what is considered to be the first "concept musical", Kurt Weill and Alan Jay Lerner's Love Life), but those successes were overshadowed by his work for the original 1953 production of The Crucible and the 1955 The Diary of Anne Frank (a play by Frances Goodrich and Albert Hackett based on Anne Frank: The Diary of a Young Girl). He continued work on Broadway into the 1960s and 1970s with musicals including Do Re Mi, Fiddler on the Roof (for which Aronson returned to his earlier experience with Jewish theatre), Cabaret, Zorba, Company, Follies, A Little Night Music, and Pacific Overtures. He won the Drama Desk Award for Outstanding Set Design three times.

In 1945, he married designer Lisa Jalowetz Aronson (1920–2013), the daughter of music conductor Heinrich Jalowetz. She helped Boris with the design of many of his productions.

Aronson designed sets for the Metropolitan Opera and ballet companies, including the production of The Nutcracker choreographed by Mikhail Baryshnikov. He was also a non-theatrical artist, working as a painter and sculptor. At the time of his death in 1980, he was a member of New York's theatre and art community and one of its designers. Aronson's wife was Lisa Jalowetz, who worked on many of Aronson's shows as his assistant.

In 1979, a year before his death, Aronson was inducted into the American Theater Hall of Fame.

Comments by directors and designers
"For Company, Harold Prince and Aronson had discussed at length a Francis Bacon painting * of a figure in motion behind a steel-and-glass coffee table.  They decided that it captured the 'frantic, anxious, driven' quality of urban life, and ... Aronson presented Prince with that famous chrome-and-glass backdrop.  ... Aronson had made a study of how many buttons he pushed on an average day in New York City ... Prince ... was delighted to find that Aronson had given him two working elevators to play with."

"Michael Bennett ... was astonished that Aronson 'didn't do three projects at once', as many designers did, but instead 'watched every line change every night.'  The veteran lighting designer Tharon Musser ... felt that she learned more from Aronson than from any other set designer in her long career. 'His design concepts were so strong that if someone went against them, the show would be ruined.'

Tony awards

1951 Season in the Sun, The Rose Tattoo and The Country Girl - winner
1956 The Diary of Anne Frank, A View from the Bridge, Once Upon A Tailor and Bus Stop - nominee
1957 A Hole in the Head and Small War on Murray Hill - nominee
1958 The Rope Dancers, Orpheus Descending and A Hole in the Head - nominee
1959 J.B. - nominee
1965 Fiddler on the Roof - nominee
1967 Cabaret - winner
1968 The Price - nominee
1969 Zorba - winner
1971 Company - winner
1972 Follies - winner
1973 A Little Night Music - nominee
1976 Pacific Overtures - winner

Selected Broadway credits
 Small Miracle (1934)
Awake and Sing! (1935)
The Merchant of Yonkers (1938) (the play which eventually became The Matchmaker and, later, the musical  Hello, Dolly!)
Ladies and Gentlemen (1939)
Cabin in the Sky (1940)
 Sadie Thompson (1944) 
The Desert Song (1946) (revival)
I Am a Camera (1951)
The Creation of the World and Other Business (1972)

References

External links

 
 
 
Boris Aronson Collection at the Harry Ransom Center at the University of Texas at Austin

Boris Aronson papers and designs, 1923-2000, held in the Billy Rose Theatre Division at the New York Public Library for the Performing Arts
Biographical sketch for Boris Aronson on the PBS/Stars Over Broadway web site
Films42 FAQ: Who was Boris Aronson? The FIDDLER Connection

1898 births
1980 deaths
Theatre people from Kyiv
People from Kievsky Uyezd
Ukrainian Jews
Soviet emigrants to Germany
Soviet emigrants to the United States
American scenic designers
Opera designers
Broadway set designers
Drama Desk Award winners
Jewish American artists
Tony Award winners
Yiddish theatre
20th-century American Jews